Steve Fiffer is an American author whose books include his memoir Three-Quarters, Two Dimes, and a Nickel.

Education
Fiffer is a graduate of New Trier High School. (1968) Yale University 1972 and the University of Chicago Law School (1976).

Career
Fiffer has collaborated with civil rights lawyer Morris Dees and former Secretary of State James Baker on the New York Times bestseller, Work Hard, Study, and Keep Out of Politics.

Fiffer's non-fiction books include Jimmie Lee and James, Tyrannosaurus Sue, Fifty Ways to Help Your Community, and How to Watch Baseball. The winner of a Guggenheim Fellowship, his work has appeared in numerous publications, including the New York Times, Chicago Tribune, and Slate.

Personal life
Fiffer and his wife Sharon, parents of three grown children, live in Evanston, Illinois.

References

American male novelists
20th-century American non-fiction writers
21st-century American non-fiction writers
1950 births
Living people
Writers from Chicago
Writers from Evanston, Illinois
Yale University alumni
University of Chicago Law School alumni
American memoirists
20th-century American male writers
Novelists from Illinois
American male non-fiction writers
21st-century American male writers